Pusp Jain (born 4 April 1956) was a member of the 13th Lok Sabha and 14th Lok Sabha of India. He represented the Pali constituency of Rajasthan and is a member of the Bharatiya Janata Party (BJP) political party.

References 

1956 births
Living people
Rajasthani politicians
People from Pali, Rajasthan
India MPs 2004–2009
India MPs 1999–2004
Lok Sabha members from Rajasthan
Bharatiya Janata Party politicians from Rajasthan